The Southern Miss Golden Eagles football program represents the University of Southern Mississippi in Hattiesburg, Mississippi. They play college football in the NCAA Division I Football Bowl Subdivision. The Eagles are currently members of the Sun Belt Conference and play their home games at M. M. Roberts Stadium in Hattiesburg, Mississippi.

History

Early history (1912–1974)
Southern Miss first fielded a football team in 1912, coached by Ronald Slay. That team posted a 2–1 record. A. B. Dille coached the Golden Eagles from 1914 to 1916, posting a record of 6–10–1. USM did not field a football team from 1917 to 1919 because of World War I. Allison Hubert was the Golden Eagles head football coach for six seasons, posting a 26–24–5 record. His Golden Eagles teams were known to be fast and fierce. Hubert departed after the 1936 season to accept the head football coach position at VMI. After Hubert came Reed Green, who coached USM for a total of nine years, from 1937 to 1942 and 1946 to 1948. His final record was 59–20–4. The Golden Eagles did not compete in football from 1943 to 1945 because of World War II. During the coaching tenure of Thad Vann, the Golden Eagles became one of the nation's most elite football programs. Vann compiled a 139–59–2 record, had only one losing season in his 20 seasons in Hattiesburg, his last. His 1953 and 1954 Golden Eagles teams upset Alabama and posted records of 9–2 and 6–4, respectively. The Golden Eagles made it to the Sun Bowl in 1954. Vann's 1958 and 1962 teams claim a national championship. Vann retired after the 1968 season and was inducted into the College Football Hall of Fame as a coach in 1987. P. W. Underwood returned to his alma mater from his post as an assistant coach at Tennessee. Underwood compiled a 31–32–2 record in his six seasons and engineered one of the biggest wins in school history in 1970, a 30–14 upset of fourth-ranked Mississippi.

Bobby Collins era (1975–1981)
Bobby Collins was the Golden Eagles head football coach for seven seasons, compiling a record of 48–30–2. Collins led the Golden Eagles to two bowl appearances, the Independence Bowl and the Tangerine Bowl after the 1980 and 1981 regular seasons. His 1981 team finished ranked No. 19 in the final Coaches' Poll. Collins left USM after the 1981 season to accept the head football coach position at SMU.

Jim Carmody era (1982–1987)
Collins was succeeded by his former defensive coordinator Jim Carmody, who coached the Golden Eagles for six seasons. Under Carmody's tutelage, Carmody's Golden Eagles compiled a record of 37–29. Only one of those six seasons did the Golden Eagles finish with a losing record, a 4–7 campaign in 1984. The Golden Eagles would only have one more losing season until 2012.

During Carmody's tenure, the Golden Eagles defeated Alabama, 38–29, in Tuscaloosa in 1982, snapping the Crimson Tide's 56-game home winning streak at Bryant–Denny Stadium. It was the first time since 1962 that Alabama had lost there and also proved to be the final loss of coach Bear Bryant's career. Carmody recruited a young Kiln, Mississippi, high school quarterback named Brett Favre to Southern Miss in 1987.
 In 1984, Southern Miss, already under NCAA sanctions for prior infractions, admitted to improper recruiting practices pertaining to freshman linebacker Don Palmer. As part of the fallout, Carmody's salary was frozen. Palmer alleged he was given clothing, basketball game tickets, cash, and transportation to the campus by an USM assistant coach.

Curley Hallman era (1988–1990)

Curley Hallman came to Southern Miss from his post as defensive backs coach at Texas A&M. Hallman's .676 winning percentage at USM is the highest of any coach in Southern Miss football history. Hallman coached future NFL star quarterback Brett Favre during his tenure at USM. Hallman's record at Southern Miss is 23–11 in three seasons. Hallman departed after the 1990 season to accept the head football coach position at LSU.

Jeff Bower era (1991–2007)
Jeff Bower came back to his alma mater as head football coach following Hallman's departure. Bower led the Golden Eagles to 14 consecutive winning seasons, the fifth longest streak in college football history and to bowl games 10 of his last 11 seasons. Bower's 119 wins are the most by any head coach in USM football history. Bower led the Golden Eagles to three Liberty Bowl appearances (two wins) in 1997, 1999 and 2003. His 1997 and 1999 teams finished ranked in the top 20 of both the AP and Coaches' Polls. Bower also led the Golden Eagles to two New Orleans Bowl victories (2004 & 2005), a GMAC Bowl victory (2006) and a Mobile Alabama Bowl victory (2000). He led the Golden Eagles to three additional bowl appearances. Bower was named Conference USA's "Coach of the Decade" in 2004. Bower resigned after the 2007 season with an overall record of 119–83–1.

Larry Fedora era (2008–2011)
Larry Fedora was hired away from his post as offensive coordinator at Oklahoma State as the USM head football coach on December 11, 2007. Fedora's four-year contract included a $650,000 per-year base salary, but incentives brought his yearly pay close to $900,000. Fedora made a big splash early in his tenure at USM, landing a commitment from five-star wide receiver prospect DeAndre Brown, who chose the Golden Eagles over offers from SEC members LSU, Ole Miss and Auburn.

In Fedora's first game as head coach, the Golden Eagles set the USM all-time record for yards in a game with 633. Southern Miss would go on to notch its four most explosive offensive seasons in program history in Fedora's four seasons. His players also graduated at the highest rate in USM history. In what turned out to be Fedora's final season, the Golden Eagles upset sixth-ranked and undefeated Houston in the Conference USA championship game en route to a Hawaii Bowl victory and rankings of No. 19 and No. 20 in the final Coaches' and AP Polls, respectively. Fedora also led the Golden Eagles to two New Orleans Bowl appearances (one win, one loss) in his first two seasons and a loss in the Beef O'Brady's Bowl to Louisville in his third. Fedora's record year-by year was back-to-back 7–6 records in 2008 and 2009, 8–5 in 2010 and a USM record 12–2 in 2011. The 2011 season was the first time USM had ever won 12 games in a single season. Fedora left after the 2011 season to accept the head football coach position at North Carolina, leaving Southern Miss with a 34–19 overall record.

Ellis Johnson era (2012)
Following Fedora's departure, Ellis Johnson was hired as head coach at USM away from South Carolina, where he served as defensive coordinator. A long-time and well-respected defensive coordinator of the SEC and ACC with extensive recruiting ties throughout the South, Johnson's hire was met with praise by most USM fans. However, the Golden Eagles success seen under Johnson's predecessors turned south quickly, as USM went 0–12 in what turned out to be Johnson's only season as head coach. It was USM's first losing season since 1993. The drop from 12–2 to 0–12 is among the largest single season drops in college football history. USM was also the only team in the nation to fail to win a single game in 2012. Fan support and attendance fell, and Johnson was fired after the disastrous season.

Todd Monken era (2013–2015)
Todd Monken was hired as the head football coach at USM from his post as offensive coordinator at Oklahoma State to turn around the suddenly downtrodden Golden Eagles football program. Monken's Golden Eagles lost their first 11 games of the 2013 season but broke a 23-game losing streak in November 2013, a 62–27 victory over UAB, their first victory since the 2011 Hawaii Bowl, Fedora's final game. After a 3–9 2014 campaign, Southern Miss finally returned to form in 2015, winning Conference USA's West Division and advancing to the conference title game, where the Golden Eagles fell to Western Kentucky. Southern Miss had one of the most productive offenses in college football and finished 2015 with a 9–5 record, including a Heart of Dallas Bowl loss to Washington. After the season, Monken accepted an offer to become the offensive coordinator of the NFL's Tampa Bay Buccaneers.

Jay Hopson era (2016–2020)
Alcorn State head coach Jay Hopson, a former USM assistant, was hired as the Golden Eagles head coach in January 2016. In his first year at the helm, Hopson led the Golden Eagles to a 7–6 record, a bowl victory, and the first win over an SEC opponent since Jeff Bower's 2000 team, defeating Kentucky in the season opener. Hopson's Eagles secured wins over three teams with winning records, a 50% increase over the prior year. Hopson is the first coach in USM history to defeat an SEC team in his first game coaching and joined Hallman (vs. Mississippi State) and Bower (vs. Auburn) as the only USM coaches to defeat an SEC opponent in their first opportunity.

The Golden Eagles finished 8–5 in 2017. They began the season on September 2, losing to Kentucky by a score of 24–17. One week later, Southern Miss defeated FCS opponent Southern by a score of 45–0. Hopson's squad won their second game of the season in their third contest as they defeated Louisiana-Monroe by a margin of 28–17. On September 30, Southern Miss lost to North Texas by a score of 43–28. That was followed by a 31–29 victory over UTSA. After a 24–0 shutout win over UTEP, the Golden Eagles defeated Louisiana Tech in the Rivalry in Dixie game by a score of 34–27 in double overtime. Hopson's team lost their next two, falling to rival UAB by a score of 30–12 and Tennessee by a margin of 24–10. Southern Miss won their last three games to close the regular season, defeating Rice by a score of 43–34, Charlotte by a margin of 66–21 and Marshall by a nail biting 28–27. Southern Miss accepted a berth in the 2017 Independence Bowl, a game they lost to Florida State by a score of 42–13.
They lost to Tulane in the Armed Forces Bowl in January 2020. After a surprising early season loss to South Alabama 32–21 in Hattiesburg, Jay Hopson unexpectedly resigned the following Monday. Athletic Director Jeremy McClain announced that Co-Offensive Coordinator and WR coach Scotty Walden would take over as interim head coach.

Conference affiliations
 Independent (1912–1930, 1942–1947, 1952–1995)
 Southern Intercollegiate Athletic Association (1931–1941)
 Gulf States Conference (1948–1951)
 Conference USA (1996–2021)
 Sun Belt Conference (2022-)

Championships

National championships

Conference championships
Southern Miss has won eight conference championships, seven outright and one shared.

† Co-champions

Division championships
Southern Miss has won three division championships.

Head coaches
List of Southern Miss head coaches.
 Ronald J. Slay (1912)
 Blondie Williams (1913)
 A. B. Dille (1914–1916)
 No team (1917–1918)
 Cephus Anderson (1919)
 B. B. O'Mara (1920)
 O. V. Austin (1921–1923)
 William Herschel Bobo (1924–1927)
 William B. Saunders (1928–1929)
 John Lumpkin (1930)
 Pooley Hubert (1931–1936)
 Reed Green (1937–1942, 1946–1948)
 No team (1943–1945)
 Thad Vann (1949–1968)
 P. W. Underwood (1969–1974)
 Bobby Collins (1975–1981)
 Jim Carmody (1982–1987)
 Curley Hallman (1988–1990)
 Jeff Bower (1990–2007)
 Larry Fedora (2008–2011)
 Ellis Johnson (2012)
 Todd Monken (2013–2015)
 Jay Hopson (2016–2020)
 Scotty Walden† (2020)
 Tim Billings† (2020)
 Will Hall (2020–present)
† Interim

Bowl history

Major bowl games
Southern Miss has participated in 25 major bowl games, garnering a record of 12–13.

Minor bowl games
Southern Miss has participated in 2 minor bowl games, garnering a record of 0–2.

Rivalries

Louisiana Tech

Known as the Rivalry in Dixie, Southern Miss and Louisiana Tech first played in 1935 and played each season from 1946 until 1972. Today, the two schools compete as conference foes in Conference USA's West Division. Tech and USM also were conference foes in the Southern Intercollegiate Athletic Association from 1935 to 1941. In addition, Tech and USM were both founding members of the Gulf States Conference which began play in 1948. The Bulldogs and Golden Eagles have played 11 times between 1975 and 1992. In 2008, Louisiana Tech AD-HC Derek Dooley and USM AD Richard Giannini signed a four-game contract to renew the rivalry with the first game being played in Ruston on September 25, 2010. The contract became unnecessary in 2012, when Louisiana Tech joined Southern Miss in Conference USA's West Division, which guarantees the schools will play each other every year.

Memphis

Known as the Black and Blue Bowl, the long-standing rivalry between Southern Miss and Memphis dates back to October 26, 1935. This yearly classic garnered its name from the intense competitive nature of the contest, as well as the competing schools' colors: the black of Southern Miss and the blue of Memphis. From 1995 to 2012, both teams were members of Conference USA in the Eastern Division. The series has been dormant since Memphis accepted an invitation to join  the American Athletic Conference.

Tulane

The Battle for the Bell is the name of the game between Southern Miss and Tulane. The two schools are located only about 110 miles from each other (Southern Miss in Hattiesburg, Mississippi, and Tulane in New Orleans, Louisiana) via Interstate 10 and Interstate 59, making for a heated game.

Beginning in 1979, The game was played annually until the reconfiguration of Conference USA in 2006 and is now played two out of four years as a cross-divisional conference match-up. The most recent game, a 46–30 victory by the Golden Eagles, was played in New Orleans in 2010.  Southern Miss holds a 23–7 lead in the series.

The series' status after 2013 is unknown due to Tulane's move to the American Athletic Conference on July 1, 2014.

Venues

M. M. Roberts Stadium

Carlisle-Faulkner Field at M. M. Roberts Stadium is nicknamed "The Rock at Southern Miss" and boasts a seating capacity of 36,000. The stadium history dates back to October 29, 1932, when the State Teachers College defeated Spring Hill College, 12–0, as some 4,000 fans looked on from wooden bleachers. On this homecoming date, the playing field was dedicated as "Faulkner Field" in honor of local businessman L. E. Faulkner, who provided the materials and equipment to build the original facility. The stadium was dedicated on September 25, 1976, with Southern Miss hosting intrastate-rival University of Mississippi. Since the opening of M. M. Roberts Stadium in 1976, Southern Miss has accumulated a winning percentage of 73% at home. In 1989, the playing field had a new irrigation system installed. The Robert "Ace" Cleveland Press Box and president's box was renovated and chairback seating was added to the west side of the stadium. In 2002, the lighting system was upgraded to provide brighter lighting and two new poles were added, one in each end zone. The playing field at Roberts Stadium underwent a name change in the 2004 summer when it was renamed Carlisle-Faulkner Field at M.M. Roberts Stadium in honor of entrepreneur Gene Carlisle who provided the contribution for the installation of a new playing surface, Momentum Turf by Sportexe. A new state-of-the-art scoreboard was installed prior to the 2007 season. Other renovations and additions include such major projects as luxury suites, club-level seating, elevators on each side of the south end zone, and a visiting team locker room.

Players

Golden Eagles to have played in the NFL, AFL or AAFC

Tumbo Abanikanda
Boston Adams
Vincent Alexander
Carl Allen
Lyneal Alston
Cornell Armstrong
Hank Autry
Ken Avery
Brian Balazik
Doug Barfield
Jearld Baylis
John Baylor
Michael Boley
Tommy Boutwell
Jeff Bower
Byron Bradfute
Jeremy Bridges
Fred Brock
Greg Brooks
Steve Broussard
Bud Brown
DeAndre Brown
Kyle Burkhart
Richard Byrd
Damion Carter
Perry Carter
Antoine Cash
Chris Clark
Sidney Coleman
Kevis Coley
Reggie Collier
Jamie Collins
Fred Cook
Austin Davis
Rod Davis
Mike Dennery
Bo Dickinson
Hanford Dixon
Demar Dotson
Tommy DuBose
Robert Ducksworth
Marcus Dupree
John Eubanks
Thomas Fairley
Brett Favre
Nollie Felts
Patrick Ferrell
Damion Fletcher
Amos Fowler
Don Fuell
Ben Garry
Jarvis Geyton
Sherrod Gideon
Reed Green
Ray Guy
Bobby Hamilton
Terry Hardy
DeMichael Harris
Tory Harrison
Marvin Harvey
Harold Hays
Robert Henderson
George Herring
Rashod Hill
Lamar Holmes
Derrick Hoskins
Daniel Hrapmann
Cooper Huckabee
Don Hultz
Michael Jackson
Jason Jimenez
Tom Johnson
Tim Jones
Ronald Jones
Mike Katrishen
Val Keckin
Jeff Kelly
William Kirksey
Maxie Lambright
Mike Landrum
Cordarro Law
Alonzo Lawrence
Cliff Lewis
Louis Lipps
John Mangum
Larry Mason
Hugh McInnis
Ryan McKee
Gerald McRath
Tarvarius Moore
Tom Morrow
 Zeke Mottad
Nick Mullens
Shawn Nelson
John Nix
Tyrone Nix
Rakeem Nuñez-Roches
Don Owens
Jeremy Parquet
Laurin Pepper
Perry Phenix
Todd Pinkston
Norris Piztoli
Jeff Posey
Norman Price
Etric Pruitt
Vic Purvis
Stephen Reaves
Kalan Reed
Jalen Richard
Tim Roberts
Korey Robertson
Tom Roussel
Doug Satcher
John Sawyer
Cedric Scott
DeQuincy Scott
Vladmir Scott
Harold Shaw
Terrill Shaw
T. J. Slaughter
Kyle Sloter
Ito Smith
Tony Smith
Daleroy Stewart
Joe Stringfellow
Brandon Sumrall
Patrick Surtain
Daryl Terrell
Adalius Thomas
Mike Thomas
Norris Thomas
Khyri Thornton
Darryl Tillman
Cameron Tom
Torrin Tucker
Art Van Tone
Joe Vetrano (AAFC)
Raymond Walls
Tom Walters
Quez Watkins
Terry Wells
Chris L. White
Chad Williams
Seante Williams
Jerrel Wilson
Sammy Winder

Retired numbers

2/3 of those players are in the Pro Football Hall of Fame. The Eagles have retired three numbers to date.

Traditions

Southern Miss to the Top

The Southern Miss to the Top! Response Cheer is used among Southern Miss alumni, students and supporters. The initiator of the cheer says "Southern Miss!" The responder says "To the Top!" Hand signals accompany the cheer, which are two gestures upward with the index finger, done by both the initiator and responder.

The District
The District is located near the intersection of US Hwy 49 and Hardy Street. The historic district of campus is anchored by the five original buildings of the campus: Ogletree House (once the President's home, now housing the Southern Miss Alumni Association), The Honor House, College Hall, Forrest Hall, and Hattiesburg Hall. It is also the traditional tailgating site for students during football season. It is home to Lake Byron, which has served as a focal point for many university activities and several weddings.

Eagle Walk
The Eagle Walk is found underneath the upper deck of M. M. Roberts Stadium. Two hours prior to football game day, a cannon is fired, which begins the procession. ROTC, The Pride of Mississippi Marching Band, University officials, and football players make a march through this street to the cheers of thousands of fans. Every fall, the incoming freshmen give the walls and street a "fresh coat of paint" as they have done for half a century.

Pride of Mississippi Marching Band

Seymour d'Campus

Over the years, Southern Miss has experienced an evolution of nicknames from Normalites to Tigers to Yellow Jackets to Confederates to Southerners. In 1972, alumni, faculty, students and staff were asked to submit new names for the athletic teams, and an ad hoc committee appointed by the Alumni Association voted on the submissions. The present mascot, the Golden Eagles, was chosen as the athletic teams’ name, and the new mascot was eventually named Seymour, an individual in a golden eagle costume. Seymour's full name is Seymour d'Campus (a pun on "see more [of] the campus"). The name was inspired by the 1984 World's Fair mascot, Seymour d'Fair (a pun on "see more [of] the Fair"), who was played by former Southern Miss mascot Jeff Davis ’83.

Future non-conference opponents 
Announced schedules as of August 9, 2022.

References

External links

 

 
American football teams established in 1912
1912 establishments in Mississippi